Gregory John Welch  (born in 1964 in Campsie, Sydney), known as Greg Welch, is an Australian triathlete. He is known for having won "The Grand Slam", which includes the ITU Triathlon World Championships (1990), The Ironman World Championship (1994), the ITU Duathlon World Championships (1993) and the Long Course Triathlon World Championship (1994). Greg was an ambassador to the UNHCR (United Nations High Commissioner for Refugees) in 2000.

Due to his being diagnosed with ventricular tachycardia, he has undergone nine open-heart surgeries from 2001 until 2003 and has retired from sports. He maintains contact with triathlon through his work as an advisor, coach and commentator with the World Triathlon Corporation.

He is married to fellow Ironman triathlete Sian Welch.

References

External links
 Official website
 Sign On San Diego article and interview

1964 births
Australian male triathletes
Duathletes
Ironman world champions
Living people
Sport Australia Hall of Fame inductees
20th-century Australian people
21st-century Australian people
Sportspeople from Sydney
Sportsmen from New South Wales